Jason Wentworth (born September 23, 1982) is an American politician who served as a Republican member of the Michigan House of Representatives. Prior to his election to the House, Wentworth worked for the Michigan Veterans Affairs Agency and was a member of the United States Army.

After graduating high school, Wentworth joined the United States Army. He spent five years as a military police officer and completed a tour in South Korea. Wentworth earned his bachelor's degree from St. Petersburg College in Florida and his master's degree in Leadership from Central Michigan University.

Prior to being elected to the Michigan House, he was the East Central Michigan Regional Coordinator for the Michigan Veterans Affairs Agency.

Following the 2020 Michigan House of Representatives election where the GOP caucus maintained its 58–52 majority, Wentworth was selected by his Republican colleagues to serve as Speaker of the House for the 2021-22 legislative sessions, to succeed the term-limited Lee Chatfield.

References

|-

1982 births
21st-century American politicians
Central Michigan University alumni
Living people
Republican Party members of the Michigan House of Representatives
St. Petersburg College alumni
United States Army officers